William Arnott may refer to:

William Arnott (biscuit manufacturer) (1827–1901), Australian manufacturer and businessman
William Arnott (politician) (1832–1907), American farmer and politician
Bob Arnott or William Robert Arnott (1922–2016), Australian skier
 W. Geoffrey Arnott (1930–2010), British Hellenist
 Sir William Melville Arnott (1909–1999), Scottish academic

See also
William Arnot (disambiguation)